Miyoko's Creamery, formerly Miyoko's Kitchen, is an American food producer founded by Miyoko Schinner in 2014.

Overview
Miyoko's Creamery specializes in dairy-free products including butter and a wide variety of different types of cheeses using traditional cheesemaking cultures and techniques, chiefly out of cashews, oats and chickpea flour.

History
Miyoko Schinner initially started a vegan food company named Now and Zen in 1997, but could not get anyone to invest in the business. She closed that company in 2003. In 2014, Schinner established "Miyoko's Kitchen", but later changed its name to "Miyoko's Creamery". The startup swiftly accrued $1 million in seed money, first being invested in by Seth Tibbott, the founder of Tofurkey. 

Fundraising continued to grow: in 2017, it obtained $6 million in funding, for a total of $12 million. In December of that year, it moved from a 4,000-square-foot facility to a 29,000-square-foot facility, located in Petaluma. Ellen DeGeneres and Portia de Rossi made an investment in Miyoko's Creamery in November 2019. In addition to vending within the United States, Miyoko's Creamery expanded its market in 2019, distributing to Canada and Australia.

Food Truck
Miyoko's Food Truck, in a Cross Country Tour starting from March 4, 2020, distributed 15,000 free grilled cheese sandwiches around the United States in order to promote cruelty-free vegan cheese in the Country.

Legal
In August of 2021, Miyoko's Creamery prevailed on First Amendment grounds in their lawsuit against the California Department of Food and Agriculture's attempts to force the company to cease using the words "Cheese" and "Butter" among others in the marketing of their products.

In February 2023, Miyoko's Creamery announced that it and Schinner had parted ways. In addition, on February 16, Miyoko's Creamery also filed a law suit against Schinner, alleging that she misappropriated confidential information and copied the data to her personal cloud after the board of directors voted to terminate her as CEO. The case was filed in the US District Court for the Norther District of California, Case 3:23-cv-00711.

On March 3, 2023, Schinner’s attorney Lisa Bloom announced that she would be filing a wrongful termination counter lawsuit. Bloom stated: “The company's behavior in forcing her out of the company she created and built, then trashing her via an outrageously malicious and misleading lawsuit will be met with facts and witnesses showing that Miyoko's own complaints of toxic and sexist behavior by certain male executives were swept under the rug, and then she was demoted and fired.”

References 

Food companies
Veganism
Cheese analogues
2014 establishments in California
Companies based in California
Agriculture companies of the United States